National Democratic Youth Front is a students organisation in Nepal. It is the student wing of the Constitutional monarchist Rastriya Prajatantra Party.

References

Student wings of political parties in Nepal
Student wings of conservative parties
Students' unions in Nepal